Aareschlucht Ost MIB railway station is a railway station in the municipality of Innertkirchen, in the Swiss canton of Bern. It is located on the  Meiringen–Innertkirchen line of the Meiringen-Innertkirchen-Bahn (MIB). Unusually, the station is located inside a tunnel that runs parallel to the Aare Gorge.

Services 
 the following services stop at Aareschlucht Ost MIB:

References

External links 
 

Railway stations in the canton of Bern
Meiringen-Innertkirchen-Bahn stations